John E. Boland (August 7, 1937 – September 2, 2015) was an American politician and educator.

Born in Saint Paul, Minnesota, Boland graduated from the St. Thomas College and University of Minnesota. He was a high school teacher and coach. Boland served in the Minnesota House of Representatives from 1971–73 and was a Democrat. In 1973, Boland resigned from the Minnesota State Legislature to serve on the Metropolitan Council as chairman until 1979. Boland was a lobbyist and served as an aide to Congressman Bruce Vento. Boland died in Saint Paul, Minnesota.

Notes

1937 births
2015 deaths
Politicians from Saint Paul, Minnesota
University of Minnesota alumni
University of St. Thomas (Minnesota) alumni
Educators from Minnesota
Democratic Party members of the Minnesota House of Representatives